Edward Coke (1758–29 Jul 1836), born Edward Roberts, was a British politician and landowner.

Edward was the second son of Wenman Coke and younger brother of Thomas Coke, the celebrated "Coke of Norfolk" and later Earl of Leicester. He was High Sheriff of Derbyshire in 1819.

He married Grace Colhoun in 1792, and they had three children:
 Thomas William Coke (born 1793)
 Edward Ralph Coke (born 1795)
 Eliza Grace Coke (born 1797), married Henry Venables-Vernon, son of Henry Venables-Vernon, 3rd Baron Vernon

His principal interests were in Derbyshire, where he lived at Longford Hall, and he was Member of Parliament for Derby from 1780 until 1817, with a brief interruption in 1807 to substitute for his brother in Norfolk.

References 

COKE, Edward (1758-1836), of Longford, Derbys. History of Parliament Online

1758 births
1837 deaths
British MPs 1780–1784
British MPs 1784–1790
British MPs 1790–1796
British MPs 1796–1800
Members of the Parliament of Great Britain for Derby
UK MPs 1801–1802
UK MPs 1802–1806
UK MPs 1806–1807
UK MPs 1807–1812
UK MPs 1812–1818
High Sheriffs of Derbyshire
Members of the Parliament of the United Kingdom for Derby
Members of the Parliament of the United Kingdom for Norfolk